Michael Elad (born December 10, 1963) is a professor of Computer Science at the Technion - Israel Institute of Technology. His work includes fundamental contributions in the field of sparse representations, and deployment of these ideas to algorithms and applications in signal processing, image processing and machine learning.

Academic career
Elad holds a B.Sc. (1986), M.Sc. (1988) and D.Sc. (1997) in electrical engineering from the Technion - Israel Institute of Technology. His M.Sc., under the guidance of Prof. David Malah, focused on video compression algorithms; and his D.Sc. on super-resolution algorithms for image sequences, guided by Prof. Arie Feuer.

After several years (1997-2001) in industrial research in Hewlett-Packard Lab Israel and in Jigami, Michael took a research associate position at Stanford University from 2001-2003, working closely with Prof. Gene Golub (CS-Stanford), Prof. Peyman Milanfar (EE-UCSC) and Prof. David L. Donoho (Statistics-Stanford).

In 2003, Elad assumed a tenure-track faculty position in the Technion's computer science department. He was tenured and promoted to associate professorship in 2007, and promoted to full-professorship in 2010.

 Associate editor for IEEE-Transactions on Image Processing (2007-2011). 
 Associate editor for IEEE-Transactions on Information Theory (2011-2014). 
 Associate editor for  Applied Computational Harmonic Analysis (2012-2015).
 Associate editor for SIAM Imaging Sciences – SIIMS (2010-2015).
 Senior editor for IEEE Signal Processing Letters (2012-2014).
 Since January 2016, he is serving as the Editor-in-Chief for SIAM Imaging Sciences – SIIMS, the prime venue for journal publications in the field of image processing.

Research 
Michael Elad works in the fields of signal processing and image processing, specializing in particular on inverse problems and sparse representations. The field of 
sparse representations introduces a universal dimensionality reduction model for data sources and signals based on "sparsity", along with various theoretical and practical tools for implementing it. In recent years this field has been shown to be intimately connected to deep-learning architectures and algorithms. Prof. Elad has authored hundreds of technical publications in this field, many of which have led to exceptional impact. Among these, he is the creator of the K-SVD algorithm, together with Michal Aharon and Bruckstein, and he is also the author of the 2010 book  "Sparse and Redundant Representations: From Theory to Applications in Signal and Image Processing".

In 2017, Prof. Elad and Yaniv Romano (his PhD student) created a specialized MOOC on sparse representation theory, given under edX.

In 2015-2018 Prof. Elad headed the Rothschild-Technion Program for Excellence. This is a flagship undergraduate program at the Technion, meant for exceptional students with emphasis on tailored and challenging study tracks for each of the ~50 students enrolled, along with an exposure to research.

Awards and recognition
Elad was the recipient of the 2008 and 2015 Henri Taub Prize for academic excellence, the 2010 Hershel-Rich prize for innovation, and the 2017 Yanai prize for excellence in teaching. His 2009 SIAM Review paper with Donoho and Bruckstein received the SIAG Imaging-Science Prize in 2014. Michael is an IEEE Fellow since 2012 (for contributions to sparsity and redundancy in image processing) and he was named a SIAM Fellow in 2018. (for contributions to the theory and development of sparse representations and their applications to signal and image processing). He was awarded the prestigious ERC advanced grant during the years 2013-2018. Prof. Elad is the recipient of three IEEE awards in 2018: (i) The IEEE Signal Processing Society (SPS) Technical Achievement Award for contributions to sparsity-based signal processing; (ii) The IEEE SPS Sustained Impact Paper Award for his K-SVD paper mentioned above; and (iii) The SPS best paper award for his paper on the Analysis K-SVD.

These lists include the ~3500 world’s most influential minds in science, covering various disciplines, from Immunology and Agriculture, through Chemistry and Physics, all the way to Computer Sciences and Engineering.

References

External links 
 Michael Elad's Webpage
 Michael Elad on Google-Scholar
 Michael Elad on the Mathematics Genealogy Project
 Michael Elad's edX Course

Fellow Members of the IEEE
Living people
1963 births
Stanford University staff
Israeli expatriates in the United States
Fellows of the Society for Industrial and Applied Mathematics